Sarah Murray may refer to:

 Sarah Murray (travel writer) (1744–1811), English travel writer
 Sarah Murray (priest) (born 1970), Scottish Episcopal priest and Provost of Inverness Cathedral
 Sarah Murray (ice hockey) (born 1988), ice hockey player and coach
 Sarah Jane Murray, Irish-born academic, screenwriter and filmmaker